Agasabal may refer to:

Agasabal, Basavana Bagevadi
Agasabal, Muddebihal